The Col de la Ruchère is a mountain pass located at 1,407 m above sea level, in the township of Saint-Christophe-sur-Guiers in the Chartreuse Mountains between the Riondettes meadow at La Ruchère and the Grande Chartreuse monastery.

This pass is only accessible by foot: from the south, fully wooded, 2 hours 30 minutes walk from Correrie at the entrance of the silence zone of the monastery;  from the north, overlooking a pasture, 1 hour 30 minutes walk from the hamlet of La Ruchère or from its northern winter sports resort area.

References

Mountain passes of Auvergne-Rhône-Alpes
Mountain passes of the Alps